

Career

Pandey began his life career as a marine engineer. Later he became a model. He then decided to act in television shows, and his first role as Rahul Shergill was in Sony Entertainment Television's popular series Bade Acche Lagte Hain from 2012–14. But it was Star Plus's longest-running daily TV show Yeh Rishta Kya Kehlata Hai, where his character Naman Agarwal gained him massive popularity from 2014–2016. He took a break since he quit Yeh Rishta Kya Kehlata Hai, but made a comeback in 2019, collaborating with Star Plus again to play Jay Mittal in Ek Bhram...Sarvagun Sampanna. He is most recently seen in the famous web show named 'Hello Mini' on mxplayer- he portrays the primary part of Ekansh in the series. The series has three seasons.

He is also a very renowned advertisement face and has done several famous commercials for various brands.

Television

Web series
2019–present - ''Hello Mini as Ekansh Tripathi

References

Indian male television actors
Living people
21st-century Indian male actors
Male actors from Delhi
Indian male models
Year of birth missing (living people)
Male actors from Mumbai